Per Arne "Pelle" Blohm (born 10 February 1967) is a Swedish former professional footballer who played as a midfielder. During his club career, he played for BK Forward, Örebro SK, IFK Norrköping, Dalian Wanda, Viking FK and GAIS between 1983 and 2001. He made one appearance for the Sweden national team in 1990.

Club career 
Blohm became one of the first Westerners to play professionally in China when he signed with Dalian Wanda in 1996. He also represented BK Forward, Örebro SK, IFK Norrköping, Viking FK and GAIS during a career that spanned between 1983 and 2001.

International career 
Having represented the Sweden U17, U19, and U21 teams, Blohm made his only appearance for the Sweden national team on 10 October 1990 when he replaced Klas Ingesson in the 80th minute of a friendly 1–3 loss against Germany.

Career statistics

International

Honours
IFK Norrköping

 Svenska Cupen: 1993-94

Dalian Wanda

 Chinese Jia-A League: 1994

References

External links

1967 births
Living people
Swedish footballers
Sweden international footballers
Association football midfielders
BK Forward players
Örebro SK players
IFK Norrköping players
Dalian Shide F.C. players
Viking FK players
GAIS players
Allsvenskan players
Eliteserien players
Swedish expatriate footballers
Expatriate footballers in China
Expatriate footballers in Norway
Swedish expatriate sportspeople in China
Swedish expatriate sportspeople in Norway